Sazonovka is a rural locality (a village) in Staromatinsky Selsoviet, Bakalinsky District, Bashkortostan, Russia. The population was 12 as of 2010. There is 1 street.

Geography 
Sazonovka is located 22 km northeast of Bakaly (the district's administrative centre) by road. Yana-Turmush is the nearest rural locality.

References 

Rural localities in Bakalinsky District